A flare star is a variable star that can undergo unpredictable dramatic increases in brightness for a few minutes. It is believed that the flares on flare stars are analogous to solar flares in that they are due to the magnetic energy stored in the stars' atmospheres. The brightness increase is across the spectrum, from X-rays to radio waves. Flare activity among late-type stars was first reported by A. van Maanen in 1945, for WX UMa and YZ CMi. However, the best-known flare star is UV Ceti, first observed to flare in 1948. Today similar flare stars are classified as UV Ceti type variable stars (using the abbreviation UV) in variable star catalogs such as the General Catalogue of Variable Stars.

Most flare stars are dim red dwarfs, although recent research indicates that less massive brown dwarfs might also be capable of flaring. The more massive RS Canum Venaticorum variables (RS CVn) are also known to flare, but it is understood that these flares are induced by a companion star in a binary system which causes the magnetic field to become tangled. Additionally, nine stars similar to the Sun had also been seen to undergo flare events prior
to the flood of superflare data from the Kepler observatory.
It has been proposed that the mechanism for this is similar to that of the RS CVn variables in that the flares are being induced by a companion, namely an unseen Jupiter-like planet in a close orbit.

Nearby flare stars
Flare stars are intrinsically faint, but have been found to distances of 1,000 light years from Earth. On April 23, 2014, NASA's Swift satellite detected the strongest, hottest, and longest-lasting sequence of stellar flares ever seen from a nearby red dwarf, DG Canum Venaticorum. The initial blast from this record-setting series of explosions was as much as 10,000 times more powerful than the largest solar flare ever recorded.

Proxima Centauri
The Sun's nearest stellar neighbor Proxima Centauri is a flare star that undergoes occasional increases in brightness because of magnetic activity. The star's magnetic field is created by convection throughout the stellar body, and the resulting flare activity generates a total X-ray emission similar to that produced by the Sun.

Wolf 359
The flare star Wolf 359 is another near neighbor (2.39 ± 0.01 parsecs). This star, also known as Gliese 406 and CN Leo, is a red dwarf of spectral class M6.5 that emits X-rays. It is a UV Ceti flare star, and has a relatively high flare rate.

Barnard's Star
Barnard's Star is the fourth nearest star to the Sun. Given its age, at 7–12 billion years of age, Barnard's Star is considerably older than the Sun. It was long assumed to be quiescent in terms of stellar activity. However, in 1998, astronomers observed an intense stellar flare, showing that Barnard's Star is a flare star.

TVLM513-46546
TVLM 513-46546 is a very low mass M9 flare star, at the boundary between red dwarfs and brown dwarfs.  Data from Arecibo Observatory at radio wavelengths determined that the star flares every 7054 s with a precision of one one-hundredth of a second.

2MASS JJ18352154-3123385 A
The more massive member of the binary star 2MASS J1835, an M6.5 star, has strong X-ray activity indicative of a flare star, although it has never been directly observed to flare.

Record-setting flares
The most powerful stellar flare detected, as of December 2005, may have come from the active binary II Peg. Its observation by Swift suggested the presence of hard X-rays in the well-established Neupert effect as seen in solar flares.

See also

References

External links
UV Ceti and the flare stars, Autumn 2003 Variable Star Of The Season prepared by Dr. Matthew Templeton, AAVSO (www.aavso.org)
Stellar Flares - D. Montes, UCM.

 
Star types